Magumu is ward in South Kinangop Division, Kinangop Constituency in Nyandarua County, Kenya.

References 

Populated places in Central Province (Kenya)
Nyandarua County